Da Silva, full name Cleonésio Carlos da Silva (born 12 April 1976) is a Brazilian former footballer who played as a forward. His previous clubs include Juventude, Jeju United & Busan I'Park & Pohang Steelers in South Korea, FC Saturn Moscow Oblast in Russia, Al-Khor SC in Qatar, Coritiba, Goiás, Portuguesa, Cruzeiro, Mamoré, Sport Recife and Criciúma.

He scored twice in 21 league games for Saturn.

Honors
 Copa do Brasil in 1996 with Cruzeiro
 Campeonato Mineiro in 1996, 1997 with Cruzeiro
 Copa Centro-Oeste in 2001 with Goiás

References

External links
 
 

1976 births
Living people
Association football forwards
Brazilian footballers
Brazilian expatriate footballers
Cruzeiro Esporte Clube players
Associação Portuguesa de Desportos players
Coritiba Foot Ball Club players
Goiás Esporte Clube players
FC Saturn Ramenskoye players
Esporte Clube Juventude players
Busan IPark players
Pohang Steelers players
Jeju United FC players
Sport Club do Recife players
Al-Khor SC players
Criciúma Esporte Clube players
Villa Nova Atlético Clube players
Russian Premier League players
K League 1 players
Expatriate footballers in Russia
Expatriate footballers in South Korea
Expatriate footballers in Qatar
Sportspeople from Minas Gerais
Brazilian expatriate sportspeople in Russia
Brazilian expatriate sportspeople in South Korea
Brazilian expatriate sportspeople in Qatar
Qatar Stars League players